The Fleetwing Handicap was an American Thoroughbred race for horses age three and older that was run between 1908 and 1953. Inaugurated at Empire City Race Track in Yonkers, New York it remained there through 1942 with the exception of 1915 when it was temporarily hosted by Belmont Park. In 1942 the Empire City Racetrack ended Thoroughbred racing, reverting to its origins as a facility exclusively for harness racing. As such, in 1943 the Fleeting Handicap was transferred to the Jamaica Race Course in Jamaica, Queens, New York.

Historical notes
The inaugural running of the Fleetwing took place on August 27, 1908 and was won by Richard Carman's Magazine who returned to win it for a second time in 1910. 

Some of the top level horses of their era that won the Fleetwing include Jack Atkin (1909), Hall of Fame inductee Sarazen (1924 and 1925), Tryster (1922), Polydor (1929), Flying Heels (1931), Fighting Fox who broke the Empire City track record while winning the 1939 race, and Sheilas Reward who in his 1950 victory at Jamaica set another new track record.

Records
Speed record:
 1:07.40  @ 5¾ furlongs: Fighting Fox (1939) & Doublrab (1942)
 1:09.40  @ 6 furlongs: Sheilas Reward (1950)

Most wins:
 Magazine (1908, 1910)
 Sarazen (1924, 1925)
 The Beasel  (1930, 1932)

Most wins by a jockey:
 3 - James Stout (1939, 1943, 1944)

Most wins by a trainer:
 3 - Max Hirsch (1924, 1925, 1928)
 3 - James E. Fitzsimmons (1939, 1943, 1944)

Most wins by an owner:
 3 - Belair Stud (1939, 1943, 1944)

Winners

References

Empire City Race Track
Jamaica Race Course
Open sprint category horse races
Discontinued horse races in New York (state)
Sports competitions in New York City
Recurring sporting events established in 1908
Recurring sporting events disestablished in 1953
1908 establishments in New York (state)
1953 disestablishments in New York (state)